Felice Pasquale Baciocchi (18 May 1762 – 27 April 1841) was born at Ajaccio into a noble, but poor, Corsican family. He was second lieutenant in the French army in 1778, lieutenant in 1788, then captain in 1794. Around 5 May 1797, he married Elisa Maria Bonaparte, Napoleon's younger sister, in Marseilles.

Baciocchi was appointed secretary to the ambassador to the Spanish Royal Court in November 1800 and moved to Madrid, while his wife remained in France. Baciocchi was then promoted to army colonel in 1802, to brigadier general in 1804, and to major general in 1809. He was also made a senator in 1804 and imperial prince in 1805.

Thanks to his brother-in-law's conquests, Baciocchi became Prince of Lucca, but without the associated power or the sovereign power, which really was exercised by his wife. He also serenely endured her infidelities.

Baciocchi was an avid amateur violinist, and he studied with violin virtuoso Niccolò Paganini for ten years while residing in Lucca and Florence. During this time, his wife and Paganini were also carrying on a romantic affair.

When Napoleon's empire collapsed, he retired with Elisa to Trieste, then to Bologna after her death in 1820. He died in that city on 27 April 1841.

Family
Baciocchi and Bonaparte had four children, of whom two survived to adulthood:
Felice Napoleon (1798–1799) 
Elisa Napoleona (1806–1869) 
Jérôme Charles (1810–1811) 
Federico Napoleon (1814–1833)

References

External links

1762 births
1841 deaths
Military personnel  from Ajaccio
House of Bonaparte
Knights of the Order of Saint Joseph
Knights of the Golden Fleece of Spain
French military personnel of the French Revolutionary Wars
French commanders of the Napoleonic Wars